Mercer County is a county located in the northwestern portion of the U.S. state of Missouri. As of the 2020 census, the population was 3,538. making it the second-least populous county in Missouri. Its county seat is Princeton. The county was organized February 14, 1845 and named for General John F. Mercer of the Revolutionary War.

History

Early years
Mercer County was organized February 14, 1845, from part of Grundy County. It is named in honor of General Hugh Mercer, who fought and died in the American Revolutionary War. The first permanent settlements in what is now Mercer County were in 1837, when a few families from other parts of Missouri moved to the area. James Parsons, a Tennessee native, is generally considered to be the first permanent settler, in the spring of 1837. The land was still included as part of Livingston County at that time and would remain so until 1841 when it would become part of the newly created Grundy County. Prior to 1837, the land was used by Native American tribes, primarily the Sac/Fox and Potawatomi, as prime hunting grounds. The occasional temporary hunting village would be established by the tribes; otherwise, the land was devoid of humans. The town of Princeton, named for the battle where General Mercer was killed, was established as the county seat in 1847. The northern boundary of the county was in dispute for the first six years of its existence due to the Honey War, a bloodless territorial dispute between Missouri and Iowa. The boundary was 9.5 miles farther north than present day prior to an 1851 decision by the U.S. Supreme Court.

Civil War
Mercer County, like its neighbor to the east Putnam County, was a staunch supporter of the Union. Most county residents had roots in northern U.S. states "back east" like Pennsylvania, Ohio, and Indiana, and did not have the strong slave-holding tradition of other northern Missouri counties like Macon, Audrain, and Monroe (commonly referred to as Little Dixie), whose population largely emigrated from Southern states. In the 1860 U.S. Census, only 12 Mercer County families were listed as slave owners, with a combined total of 24 slaves. Fewer than 20 Mercer County men fought for the Confederacy, while well over 1,000 volunteered for Union service. Among the units containing men from Mercer County were the 23rd, 27th and 35th Regiments, the 2nd and 12th Cavalry, the 5th Kansas Cavalry, and various smaller units of the Missouri State Militia. The 44th Missouri Infantry (USA), consisting of men from Mercer, Grundy, Sullivan, and other northwest Missouri counties, served a pivotal role in the Union victory at the Battle of Franklin, TN, on November 30, 1864.

Geography

Adjacent counties
Decatur County, Iowa (northwest)
Wayne County, Iowa (north)
Putnam County (east)
Sullivan County (southeast)
Grundy County (south)
Harrison County (west)

Major highways
 U.S. Route 65
 U.S. Route 136

Demographics

As of the census of 2010, there were 3,785 people, 1,600 households, and 1,089 families residing in the county.  The population density was 8 people per square mile (3/km2).  There were 2,125 housing units at an average density of 5 per square mile (2/km2).  The racial makeup of the county was 98.72% White, 0.19% Black or African American, 0.56% Native American, 0.05% Pacific Islander, 0.03% from other races, and 0.45% from two or more races. Approximately 0.29% of the population were Hispanic or Latino of any race.

There were 1,600 households, out of which 28.30% had children under the age of 18 living with them, 57.60% were married couples living together, 6.70% had a female householder with no husband present, and 31.90% were non-families. 29.30% of all households were made up of individuals, and 17.60% had someone living alone who was 65 years of age or older.  The average household size was 2.31 and the average family size was 2.83.

In the county, the population was spread out, with 23.00% under the age of 18, 6.70% from 18 to 24, 24.20% from 25 to 44, 24.00% from 45 to 64, and 22.00% who were 65 years of age or older.  The median age was 42 years. For every 100 females there were 95.70 males.  For every 100 females age 18 and over, there were 92.60 males.

The median income for a household in the county was $29,640, and the median income for a family was $35,313. Males had a median income of $26,690 versus $19,814 for females. The per capita income for the county was $15,140.  About 10.20% of families and 13.30% of the population were below the poverty line, including 13.30% of those under age 18 and 14.50% of those age 65 or over.

2020 Census

Education
North Mercer County R-III School District - Mercer 
North Mercer County Elementary School (PK-06) 
Mercer High School (07-12)
Princeton R-V School District - Princeton 
Princeton Elementary School (PK-06) 
Princeton High School (07-12)

Public libraries
Mercer County Library

Politics

Local
The Republican Party predominantly controls politics at the local level in Mercer County. Republicans hold all of the elected positions in the county. In the 2020 presidential election, Mercer County had the highest Republican turnout in the state of Missouri with greater than 86% of the population voting for Donald Trump.

State

All of Mercer County is a part of Missouri's 3rd District in the Missouri House of Representatives and is represented by Danny Busick (R-Newtown).

All of Mercer County is a part of Missouri's 12th District in the Missouri Senate and is currently represented by Dan Hegeman (R-Cosby).

Federal

All of Mercer County is included in Missouri's 6th Congressional District and is currently represented by Sam Graves (R-Tarkio) in the U.S. House of Representatives.

Communities

Cities
Mercer
Princeton (county seat)

Village
South Lineville

Census-designated place
Ravanna

Other communities
Mill Grove
Modena

Historical communities
Source

Adel 
Alvord 
Burrows 
Cleopatra 
Dinsmore 
Goshen 
Half Rock 
Ilia 
Saline 
Topsy (Newtown) 
Wataga

Townships
Source

Harrison
Lindley
Madison
Marion
Medicine
Morgan
Ravanna
Somerset
Washington

See also
National Register of Historic Places listings in Mercer County, Missouri
Roy Alvin Baldwin, Texas state representative who co-authored the 1923 legislation establishing Texas Tech University, born at Half Rock in Mercer County in 1885

References

External links
 Digitized 1930 Plat Book of Mercer County from University of Missouri Division of Special Collections, Archives, and Rare Books

 
1845 establishments in Missouri
Populated places established in 1845